Taylor Joshua McKenzie (born 30 May 1994) is an English professional footballer who plays as a defender for Cheshunt F.C.

McKenzie made his Notts County debut on 9 November 2014 in a 0–0 draw against Accrington Stanley at Meadow Lane, in the first round of the FA Cup, coming on as a 37th-minute substitute for Hayden Mullins.

A few days later on 15 November 2014, he made his Football League debut against Coventry City at the Ricoh Arena in a 1–0 League One win.

References

External links 

1994 births
Living people
English footballers
Association football defenders
Gainsborough Trinity F.C. players
Notts County F.C. players
Wrexham A.F.C. players
Corby Town F.C. players
Chesham United F.C. players
Enfield Town F.C. players
National League (English football) players
English Football League players